was a Japanese ceramic designer born in Saga Prefecture, Japan. The well known "G-type Soy Sauce Bottle" he designed in 1958 won the 1st Good Design Award in 1960 and its production and sales have continued until today (as of December 11, 2011). He won the Good Design Award more than 110 times in his life. In describing his design philosophy, he stated, "My pleasure as a designer is to conceive of forms for daily use, and to create pieces for production in the factory, so that many people can appreciate and enjoy using them". He worked to design ceramic dishes suitable for the Japanese lifestyle in post-World War II.

Biography 

 14 November 1927 Born in Shiota-cho Fujitsu-gun, Saga prefecture (Currently Shiota-cho Ureshino-shi, Saga prefecture)
 Apr, 1941 Saga Prefectural Arita Institute of Technology (Currently Saga Prefectural Arita Technical High School) Design department (till Mar, 1945)
 Jan, 1946 Studied under the potter Haizan Matsumoto (〜1947年)
 Apr, 1948 Studied at Department of craft and design, Tama College of Art and Design (Currently Tama Art University) (till Mar, 1952)
 Jun, 1949 Worked as a research student at the 2nd design office, craft guidance office, Ministry of Commerce (till 1951)
 Apr, 1952 Worked at the editorial department of Gakken Co., Ltd. (till 1953)
 Jan, 1954 Worked at the design office, Ceramic technology guidance office in Nagasaki (Currently Ceramic Research Center of Nagasaki ) (till 1956)
 Jul, 1956 Worked for Hakusan porcelain co., ltd.　Worked at the design office set up some time later (till Mar, 1978)
 Oct, 1958 Participated in the workshop by Kaj Franck(Finnish designer) Industry and crafts guidance office, Ministry of Commerce invited (Tokyo)
 Oct, 1961 Went over the design in Europe and the United States. Met Isamu Noguchi at Genichiro Inokuma's home in United States. Visited Kaj Franck in Finland. (till Nov, 1961)
 1965 A member of Japan Design Committee (till November 12, 2005)
 Apr, 1974 Professor,  Faculty of Fine Arts in Kyushu Sangyo University (till 1982)
 1976 A member of the nominating committee for Mainichi Design Prize (till 1995)
 Mar, 1978 Quit Hakusan porcelain co., ltd.
 Apr, 1978 Established Mori Masahiro Industrial Design Laboratory
 Sep, 1978 Panelist of the session meeting, the 8th World Craft Conference in Kyoto
 1979 A member of the International Academy of Ceramics (till November 12, 2005)
 Apr, 1985 Guest professor at the Ceramics Division in the Department of Design and Craft, Aichi Prefectural University of Fine Arts and Music (till 1989)
 Apr, 1989 Professor at the Ceramics Division in the Department of Design and Craft, Aichi Prefectural University of Fine Arts and Music (till 1993)
 Jun, 1992 Lectured titled "Farms of Nature and Life" at University of Art and Design Helsinki in Finland. Symposium "Interaction in ceramics : art, design and research" 
 1989 The exploratory committee for Ceramics Park (Hasami, Nagasaki) was established. Took care of Ceramic art wall "Ceramic Road (Toji no michi)", the symbol mark of the park and the design of facilities such as lounge. Directed the restoration of 12 "Kilns in the world" at the open-air museum. (till 1996)
 Apr, 1999 Guest professor, Aichi Prefectural University of Fine Arts and Music (till 2005)
 2004 Won the Masaru Katsumi Award
 November 12, 2005 Died at a hospital in Sasebo, Nagasaki

Works

In the 1950s

In the 1960s

In the 1970s

In the 1980s

In the 1990s

Awards and honors 
 May 1960 The 1st Good Design Award by Good Design Committee (current Japan Design Committee)
 1960 Good Design (G mark) Selection (Ministry of International Trade and Industry) G-type Soysauce Bottle
 1973 The 1st KUNII KITARO Industrial Design Award (Japan Industrial Arts Foundation)
 Jan, 1975 The 20th Mainichi Industrial Design Award (Sponsored by The Mainichi Newspapers)
 Jul, 1975 International Ceramic Art Exhibition, Industrial Department Gold award, Faenza Italy for P-type Coffee Service
 1977 The 7th International Industrial Design Exhibition in Valencia, Spain, Gold Prize in the Ceramic Division for A-type Party Tray
 Mar, 1983 The 13th International Industrial Design Exhibition in Valencia, Spain, Grand Prix in the Ceramic Division for Shell Bowl
 May 1999 Japan Ceramic Society Gold Award (Japan Ceramic Society)
 2004 Masaru Katsumi Award

Exhibitions 
 Feb, 1969 Perspectives of Modern Design (National Museum of Modern Art, Kyoto) - Invited exhibits (Table ware set)
 Feb, 1982 ”Modern dishes - Pouring" (National Museum of Modern Art, Tokyo) - Invited exhibits (G-type Soysauce Bottle, P-type Coffee Service etc.)
 Nov, 1985 "Prospects for Contemporary Japanese Art - Design in the life" (Museum of Modern Art, Toyama) - Invited exhibits (Series "Shell")
 Dec, 1986 "Japanese avant-garde1910-1970" (Centre Georges Pompidou, Paris) - Invited exhibits (G-type Soysauce Bottle)
 Jul, 1991 "Japanese modern pottery dishes" (Aberystwyth Arts Centre, Wales, United Kingdom) - (Series "Ripples" etc.)
 Jul, 1993  "Design made in Nippon" (Hiroshima City Museum of Contemporary Art) - Invited exhibits (G-type Soysauce Bottle)
 Oct, 1993 "Always looking at our lifestyle - Considering of Modern Ceramics Dishes" (The Museum of Modern Art, Saitama) - Invited exhibits (Shallow Ricebowl etc.)
 Sep, 1994 "Japanese Design after 1950" (Philadelphia Museum of Art、USA) - Invited exhibits (G-type Soysauce Bottle, A-type Party Tray)
 Sep, 1997 "10 Designers from all over the world" (Museo Internazionale delle Ceramiche, Italy) - Invited exhibits (Test-B with Cylinder etc.)
 Jun, 1998 "Masahiro Mori's Ceramic Design" (Aichi Prefectural Ceramic Museum)
 Oct, 1998 "Product Designer Mori Masahiro Exhibition" (Nagasaki Prefectural Museum)
 Oct, 1999 "Movements of Contemporary Japanese art - New landscape of industrial design" (Museum of Modern Art, Toyama) - Invited exhibits (Ricebowl)
 May, 2000 "Masahiro Mori - Japanese Modern Ceramic Design" (German Porcelain Museum, Art Museum in Halle Germany)
 Jun, 2001 "Footprint of Masahiro Mori's Ceramic Design" (Gallery at Saga city public library) Japan Ceramic Society Gold Award Commemorative
 Jun, 2002 "Masahiro Mori: A Reformer of Ceramic Design" (National Museum of Modern Art, Tokyo)
 Oct, 2009 "Retrospective of Masahiro Mori's oeuvre - Seeking the affluence of daily dishes" Organizers (Agency for Cultural Affairs |  Executive Committee for the promotion plan for regional arts and culture in Saga | Executive Committee for the Retrospective of Masahiro Mori's oeuvre.) Co-organizer (The Kyushu Ceramic Museum)

See also 
 Haizan Matsumoto
 Katsuhei Toyoguchi
 Masaru Katsumi
 Kaj Franck
 Isamu Kenmochi
 Yusaku Kamekura
 Sori Yanagi
 Kenji Ekuan
 Osamu Ishiyama
 Kenya Hara
 Naoto Fukasawa

Notes 
 "Product designer Mori Masahiro Exhibition" Nagasaki Prefectural Art Museum (Oct, 1998)
 "Ceramic Standard - Masahiro Mori Collection -" Petit Grand Publishing, Inc., (May, 2005) 
 Mori Masahiro Design Studio, LLC. "The works of Masahiro Mori" Random House Kodansha (Oct, 2009)

External links 

 Japan Design Committee (Masahiro Mori had served on since 1965.)
 Hakusan Toki (The company Masahiro Mori worked for 22 years, from June 1956 to March 1978.)
 Mori Masahiro Design Studio, LLC. (Official website. Legal organization for management of Masahiro Mori's design properties.)

1927 births
2005 deaths
Japanese industrial designers
Japanese ceramists
People from Saga Prefecture
20th-century ceramists